Gymnastics competitions at the 2022 Commonwealth Games in Birmingham, England, were held from 29 July to 6 August 2022. The sport made its tenth appearance since its 1978 debut and its second appearance within England specifically, spread across twenty events.

Schedule
The competition schedule was as follows:

Venue
The gymnastics competitions are being held at Arena Birmingham, a venue which has played host to more than 30 sports in its history.

Medal summary

Medal table

Artistic

Men's events

Women's events

Rhythmic

Participating nations
There were 22 participating Commonwealth Games Associations (CGA's) in gymnastics with a total of 132 (56 men and 76 women) athletes. The number of athletes a nation entered is in parentheses beside the name of the country.

Artistic
A total of 103 (56 men and 47 women) artistic gymnasts from 21 CGA's competed.

Rhythmic
A total of 29 rhythmic gymnasts from 13 CGA's competed.

Controversies
On 26 May 2022, Northern Irish gymnast and reigning Commonwealth Games champion on pommel horse, Rhys McClenaghan, announced on Twitter that he and his teammates, Eamon Montgomery and Ewan McAteer, would not be allowed by the International Gymnastics Federation (FIG) to compete at the 2022 Commonwealth Games due to them representing Ireland in international competition where Northern Ireland does not compete. The FIG stated that Irish gymnasts competing for Northern Ireland would be "a violation of the FIG Statutes and rules" and recommended that the athletes concerned change their FIG license nationality (in effect, switch to a British licence) if they wished to regain eligibility. The Northern Ireland Commonwealth Games Council accused the FIG of "completely disregarding" the 1998 Good Friday Agreement which states that people from Northern Ireland can consider themselves British, Irish, or both; at the time, no other ASOIF member federation associated with the Commonwealth Games had adopted the FIG's stance.

On 27 June the decision was overturned and the three Northern Irish gymnasts were permitted to compete at the Commonwealth Games for Northern Ireland while still representing the island of Ireland at other international competitions.

References

External links
 Results Book – Gymnastics - Artistic
 Results Book - Gymnastics - Rhythmic

 
2022 Commonwealth Games events
Commonwealth
2022
International gymnastics competitions hosted by the United Kingdom